Lucia Brown Berlin (November 12, 1936 – November 12, 2004) was an American short story writer. She had a small, devoted following, but did not reach a mass audience during her lifetime. She rose to sudden literary fame in 2015, eleven years after her death, with the publication of a volume of her selected stories, A Manual for Cleaning Women. It hit The New York Times bestseller list in its second week, and within a few weeks had outsold all her previous books combined.

Early life 
Berlin was born in Juneau, Alaska, and spent her childhood on the move, following her father's career as a mining engineer. The family lived in mining camps in Idaho, Montana and Arizona, and Chile, where Lucia spent most of her youth. As an adult, she lived in New Mexico, Mexico, New York City, Northern and Southern California, and Colorado.

Career 
Berlin began publishing relatively late in life, under the encouragement and sometimes tutelage of poet Ed Dorn. Her first small collection, Angels Laundromat, was published in 1981, but her published stories were written as early as 1960. She published seventy-six stories in her lifetime. Several of her stories appeared in magazines such as The Atlantic and Saul Bellow's The Noble Savage. Berlin published six collections of short stories, but most of her work can be found in three later volumes from Black Sparrow Books: Homesick: New and Selected Stories (1990), So Long: Stories 1987-92 (1993) and Where I Live Now: Stories 1993-98 (1999).

Berlin was never a bestseller, but was widely influential within the literary community. She has been compared to Raymond Carver and Richard Yates. Her one-page story "My Jockey", consisting of five paragraphs, won the Jack London Short Prize for 1985. Berlin also won an American Book Award in 1991 for Homesick, and was awarded a fellowship from the National Endowment for the Arts.

In 2015, a compendium of her short story work was released under the title, A Manual for Cleaning Women: Short Stories. It debuted at #18 on the New York Times bestseller list its first week, and rose to #15 on the regular list the following week. The collection was ineligible for most of the year-end awards (either because she was deceased, or it was recollected material), but was named to a large number of year-end lists, including the New York Times Book Reviews "10 Best Books of 2015.". It debuted at #14 on the ABA's Indie bestseller list and #5 on the LA Times' list. It was also a finalist for the Kirkus Prize.

Influences and teaching 
Throughout her life, Berlin earned a living through a series of working class jobs, reflected in story titles like "A Manual for Cleaning Women," "Emergency Room Notebook, 1977," and "Private Branch Exchange" (referring to telephone switchboards and their operators).

Up through the early 1990s, Berlin taught creative writing in a number of venues, including the San Francisco County Jail and the Jack Kerouac School of Disembodied Poetics at Naropa University. She also took oral histories from elderly patients at Mt. Zion Hospital.

In the fall of 1994, Berlin began a two-year teaching position as Visiting Writer at University of Colorado, Boulder. Near the end of her term, she was one of four campus faculty awarded the Student Organization for Alumni Relations Award for Teaching Excellence. "To win a teaching award after two years is unheard of," the English Chair Katherine Eggert said later in an obituary. Berlin was asked to stay on at the end of her two-year term. She was named associate professor, and continued teaching there until 2000.

Critical praise 
Berlin has been called one of America's best kept secrets.

"I would place her somewhere in the same arena as Alice Munro, Grace Paley, maybe Tillie Olsen. In common with them, she writes with a guiding intelligent compassion about family, love, work; in a style that is direct, plain, clear, and non-judgmental; with a sense of humor and a gift for the gestures and the words that reveal character, the images that reveal the nature of a place."
—Lydia Davis, New Ohio Review, on the story A Manual for Cleaning Women

"[The stories] are told in a conversational voice and they move with a swift and often lyrical economy. They capture and communicate moments of grace and cast a lovely, lazy light that lasts. Berlin is one of our finest writers and here she is at the height of her powers."
—Molly Giles, San Francisco Chronicle, on So Long

"Berlin's literary model is Chekhov, but there are extra-literary models too, including the extended jazz solo, with its surges, convolutions, and asides. This is writing of a very high order."
—August Kleinzahler, London Review of Books, on Where I Live Now

"In the field of short fiction, Lucia Berlin is one of America's best kept secrets. That's it. Flat out. No mitigating conditions. End of review. Well, not quite… [It is] characteristic of all Berlin's stories, a buoyancy: however grim and 'unworthy' her characters, she enters and explores their lives with unfailing high spirits.... A drug rehab center in New Mexico; a story called 'Electric Car, El Paso' ('It was very tall and short, like a car in a cartoon that had run into a wall. A car with its hair standing on end.')... The Christmas party at the dialysis center. 'The machine makes a humming sucking sound with an occasional slurp.' Hundreds of bubble lights on the Christmas tree that gurgle and flow. The man who had had a cadaver transplant. The man who looks like a sweaty manatee. The girl who looks like an albino dinosaur, or an anorexic whippet.... And it goes on, relentless. We're in the West Oakland detox, the residents in the TV pit, watching Leave It to Beaver.... Dust to Dust: 'There are things people just don't talk about. I don't mean the hard things, like love, but the awkward ones, like how funerals are fun sometimes....' In more ways than one, this book is Lucia Berlin."
—Paul Metcalf, Conjunctions: 14, on Safe & Sound

"This remarkable collection occasionally put me in mind of Annie Proulx's Accordion Crimes, with its sweep of American origins and places. Berlin is our Scheherazade, continually surprising her readers with a startling variety of voices, vividly drawn characters, and settings alive with sight and sound."
—Barbara Barnard, American Book Review, on Where I Live Now

Personal life 
Berlin was married three times and had four sons.

Berlin was plagued by health problems, including double scoliosis. Her crooked spine punctured one of her lungs, and she was never seen without an oxygen tank beside her from 1994 until her death. She retired when her condition grew too severe to work, and she later developed lung cancer. She struggled with radiation therapy, which she said felt like having one's bones ground to dust. As her health and finances deteriorated, Berlin moved into a trailer park on the edge of Boulder, and later, a converted garage behind her son's house outside Los Angeles. The move allowed her to be closer to her sons, and made breathing easier (Boulder's elevation had exacerbated her lung problems). Lucia died in her home in Marina del Rey, on her 68th birthday, with one of her favorite books in her hands.

Works and publications

Bibliography 
 A Manual for Cleaning Ladies. Illustrations by Michael Myers. Washington, D.C. [i.e. Healdsburg, California]: Zephyrus Image, 1977. 
 Angels Laundromat: Short Stories. Cover art and illustrations by Michael Shannon Moore. Berkeley, CA: Turtle Island for the Netzahaulcoyotl Historical Society, 1981.   
 Legacy. Berkeley, CA: Poltroon Press, 1983. Illustrated by Michael Bradley. 
 Phantom Pain: Sixteen Stories. Bolinas, CA: Tombouctou Books, 1984.  
 Safe & Sound. Berkeley, CA: Poltroon Press, 1988. Illustrated by Frances Butler.  
 Homesick: New & Selected Stories. Santa Rosa CA: Black Sparrow Press, 1990.  
 So Long: Stories, 1987-1992. Santa Rosa, CA: Black Sparrow Press, 1993.  
 Where I Live Now: Stories, 1993-1998. Santa Rosa, CA: Black Sparrow Press, 1999.  
 A Manual for Cleaning Women: Selected Stories. Edited by Stephen Emerson. Foreword by Lydia Davis. New York, NY: Farrar, Straus and Giroux, 2015.  
 Evening in Paradise: More Stories. Farrar, Straus and Giroux, 2018. 
Welcome Home: A Memoir with Selected Photographs and Letters. Farrar, Straus and Giroux, 2018.

In periodicals (posthumous) 
 Berlin, Lucia. 2005. "Letters to August Kleinzahler." The London Review of Books. Vol. 27, No. 15: pp. 33–34.  
 Berlin, Lucia. 2015. "B.F. and Me." The Paris Review. No. 213: Summer 2015. pp. 269–269.

Multimedia 
 Berlin, Lucia, Yasunari Kawabata, and Amy Hempel. Lucia Berlin: Summer 1991. Naropa Institute, 1991. 3 audio cassettes. Audio of two classes held at Naropa Institute in Boulder, Colorado during Summer 1991. Naropa Audio Archive: 20051107, 20051111. 
 Berlin, Lucia. Lucia Berlin Reading 12 Nov 93 at Lincoln Lecture Hall, Naropa. Naropa Institute, 1993. 1 audio cassette. Lucia Berlin reading at Naropa Institute November 12, 1993. Naropa Audio Archive: 20051208. 
 Berlin, Lucia, Bobbie Louise Hawkins, Molly Giles, and Lorna Dee Cervantes. W&P Reading Cervantes; Hawkins; Giles, Berlin. Naropa Institute, 1997. 2 audio cassettes. Writing and poetics reading featuring Lorna Dee Cervantes, Bobbie Louise Hawkins, Molly Giles, and Lucia Berlin. Naropa Audio Archive: 20060118, 20060119.

Other 
 Berlin, Lucia. Rigorous. Oakland, CA: Mark Berlin, 1992. 
 Berlin, Lucia. From Luna Nueva. Boulder, CO: Kavyayantra Press at Jack Kerouac School of Disembodied Poetics, November 1993. 
 Berlin, Lucia. The Moon: There's No Moon Like on a Clear New Mexico Night. Boulder, CO: Kavyayantra Press at Jack Kerouac School of Disembodied Poetics, 1997.

References

Further reading

External links 
 Lucia Berlin at Black Sparrow Press
 Lucia Berlin's impact on a bestselling author Vanity Fair
"Sex on the Roof" A discussion of Lucia Berlin's life and two new works. London Review of Books, December 2018

1936 births
2004 deaths
American women short story writers
American short story writers
Naropa University faculty
University of Colorado faculty
Writers from Alaska
American Book Award winners
20th-century American women
20th-century American people
American women academics
21st-century American women